My Antonia is a 1995 American cable made-for-television drama film based on the 1918 novel of the same name written by Willa Cather, produced for the USA Network. The movie was directed by Joseph Sargent and starred Jason Robards, Eva Marie Saint, and Neil Patrick Harris. It was filmed in part at the Stuhr Museum in Grand Island, Nebraska.

Cast
Jason Robards as Josiah Burden
Eva Marie Saint as Emmaline Burden
Neil Patrick Harris as Jimmy Burden
Jan Triska as Mr. Shimerda
Norbert Weisser as Otto
Anne Tremko as Lena Lingard
Travis Fine as Harry Paine
Mira Furlan as Mrs. Shimerda
Elina Löwensohn as Antonia Shimerda
Bobby Goldstein as Ambrosch Shimerda
T. Max Graham as Mr. Harling
John Livingston as Charley Harling
Pas Sarah Bernhardt as Sally Harling
Devon Arielle Cahill as Nina Harling
Lauren Montgomery as Yulka Shimerda
Cinnamon Schultz as Helga
Megan Birdsall as Margaret
Lemarrt Holman as Blindman Arnault
Abby Sullivan as Mrs. Carlsen
Betty Laird as Mrs. Vannis
Brendan McCurdy as Ambrosch Cuzak
Ian Atwood as Leo Cuzak
Tom Wees as Conductor
Brad Boesen as Traveling Salesman
Endre Hules as Russian Peter
Boris Lee Krutonog as Russian Pavel
Olek Krupa as Krajiek
Kyla Pratt as Yulka Cuzak
Myra Turley as Mrs. Harling
Blair Williamson as Marek Shimerda

References

External links

 My Antonia at YouTube

1995 television films
1995 films
1995 drama films
Willa Cather
Films based on American novels
Films set in Nebraska
Films shot in Nebraska
Czech-American culture in Nebraska
Films directed by Joseph Sargent
Grand Island, Nebraska
USA Network original programming
American drama television films
1990s English-language films
1990s American films